On 30 August 2014, Lesotho's Prime Minister Tom Thabane alleged that a coup d'état had been launched against him. This followed a previous allegation which caused him to suspend parliament over possible extra-constitutional manoeuvres. It also followed pressure from South Africa to maintain the democratic process. The next day, Deputy Prime Minister Mothetjoa Metsing assumed responsibility for running the government. An early election was held in February 2015 as a result of South African-led Southern African Development Community (SADC) mediation, giving power to the opposition.

Background
Following the general election of 2012, the All Basotho Convention's Tom Thabane was elected as prime minister as head of a three party coalition after ousting long serving Prime Minister Pakalitha Mosisili. On 19 June 2014, Thabane suspended parliament over fears of a coup d'état, allowing him to avoid a vote of confidence; this was sanctioned by King Letsie III. In reaction, the South African government issued a statement that read it "notes with concern the unfolding political and security situation in the Kingdom of Lesotho which has resulted in the prorogation of the country's parliament. The South African government has further noted with grave concern the unusual movements of the Lesotho Defence Force Units in the capital, Maseru. South Africa will not tolerate any unconstitutional change of government in the region and continent." Deputy Prime Minister Mothetjoa Metsing also suggested he would form a new government upon Thabane's removal. Meanwhile, in addition to South Africa, the Southern African Development Community also warned the political rivals of unconstitutional changes of government which would not be tolerated.

Coup d'état

On 30 August, at about 3:00 gunshots were heard in Maseru. Though the city was calm later in the day, people were said to be staying at home. Though there were no reports of deaths, the Lesotho Times termed it a "bloodless coup attempt." The army was said to have acted after Thabane tried to remove its chief, Lieutenant General Kennedy Tlali Kamoli, but the army said he was still in charge and that the military "supports the democratically elected government of the day." Army spokesman Major Ntlele Ntoi denied staging a coup saying: "There is nothing like that, the situation has returned to normalcy...the military has returned to their barracks." This followed a military presence on the streets of the capital and radio stations, including private ones and Radio Lesotho, being taken off air and phone lines cut, but they were working later in the day. Sports Minister Thesele Maseribane said that soldiers had surrounded State House, including government and police headquarters. He added that an unnamed military commander was looking for him, Thabane and Mothetjoa Metsing to take to the king and that "in our country, that means a coup" yet he insisted Thabane's government was still in control of the country. A reinforced military contingent was reportedly guarding Thabane's official residence and that soldiers were patrolling the streets of Maseru. The military had also disarmed police.

Thabane said he fled to South Africa amid fear for his life and that he would return "as soon as I know I am not going to get killed." He added that the alleged coup had rendered the government "dysfunctional" and that "I have been removed from control not by the people but by the armed forces, and that is illegal." He left with his family after getting reports he was targeted for assassination. He later said the action resulted from "total indiscipline" in the army with soldiers "running around the streets, threatening people" and "quite openly stating that they want my neck." He further accused an unnamed military commander of leading the unrest and that it was a reaction to his government's attempt to stem corruption; while he also called for SADC to help restore order. Conversely, officials who denied the coup plot said that they had moved against police elements suspected of trying to arm a political faction and that soldiers had returned to their barracks. One policeman was killed in the incident.

Aftermath

The next day, Metsing assumed responsibility for running the government. Following calls by Thabane for South African peacekeepers, by 3 September, South African police had escorted Thabane back to Maseru, according to Assistant Police Commissioner Lehloka Maphatsoe. Police Commissioner Khothatso Tsooana said that the South African police were present for extra security and that he had ordered the Lesotho police to return to work after being told to stop work and not wear uniforms to prevent attacks on police. Metsing also said the leader of the third party in the coalition also returned to Lesotho. The SADC added that it was sending an envoy and an observer team to help restore stability and security; while Lesotho's leaders agreed on a roadmap with a "clear timeline" towards removing the parliamentary suspension and agreed to release a joint statement "appealing for calm and exercise restraint with a view to rapidly bring law and order back in the kingdom."

A 12 September deadline to reach a consensus was passed without agreement. South Africa Deputy President Cyril Ramaphosa then took responsibility from Jacob Zuma's mediation efforts to get an agreement amongst the governing coalition. Chief among the discussion was the re-calling of the legislature. As a result of the failure, South Africa called for an emergency meeting of the SADC. One of those who fled the country, Thesele Maseribane, then asked: "How can you open your own parliament when you still have foreign troops here, protecting you? Everyone’s interested in parliament, but what about what recently happened here? This is not a movie. This is reality. This was an attempted coup." Deputy Prime Minister Mothetjoa Metsing's Lesotho Congress for Democracy (LCD) was blamed, along with General Kamoli, for the putsch. Kamoli raided government armouries in preparation for a possible showdown, while his allies warned of a "bloodbath" if he is forcibly removed. The SADC has also rebuffed calls by some domestic leaders for a military intervention, instead opting for a political resolution.

On 30 September, under the SADC mandate to help creating dialogue, Ramaphosa arrived in the country. In ongoing developments at the time, Senate Chief Whip Khoabane Theko said that the prime minister's office had too much constitutional power and there was no provision for coalition dispute resolution, yet he also rejected calls to empower the king in order to help resolve political disagreements. "In our constitution, there is nowhere, where the prime minister is obliged maybe to consult when he does anything with his partner in the coalition. So we still have that problem on the ground. [Yet] I don’t want to put the monarchy in danger. I don’t want my king to be beheaded like Charles I in England in the old times." He further noted: "It is very unsettling because nobody is sure what is going to happen. There was an attempted coup...[and] that has made the people very unsettled on our political spectrum. There is so much uncertainty and of course business is not doing well because...Every time it’s 6 "O’clock in the evening everybody wants to get to his household to make sure that he does not meet a bullet or something like that." He suggested that the tensions could be reduced if the root cause involving Kamoli, who refused to step down when Thabane replaced him with Lieutenant General Maaparankoe Mahao as head of Lesotho Defense Force, leads to "Kamoli himself really relinquishes power and maybe make way for...Lieutenant General Maaparankoe Mahao." It could, however, also worsen if the other side gets its way. "There are a lot of people who are in a hurry so that they can call for a motion of no confidence against the incumbent prime minister, which I think is a very quick fix consolation that cannot help Basotho at all."

Thabane and unnamed allies were then receiving round-the-clock protection from Namibian and South African police in the country. In a resolution to the conflict, the Maseru Facilitation Declaration was signed. The scheduled election was brought forward by two years and would occur in February 2015. The announcement was made by Ramaphosa, who added that the exact date would be determined by King Letsie III. Thabane said that the time had come to "go back to the electorate and get a fresh mandate. I still have it in me to go to the hustings and campaign." Russia also welcomed the deal.

On 17 October, parliament reconvened in a bid to avert the political crisis with Thabane's advisor Tumisang Mosotho saying: "It’s a milestone. We want to hope this is the first step in the right direction, in liberating our country from the danger that has surrounded us these past few months." Senate Chief Whip Khoabane Theko said: "This is what we can call maybe the beginning of the process that takes us to the elections, because we are going to have a budget and maybe deliberate other laws … ahead of our elections from here on." Parliament was officially re-convened in October by Letsie III and was celebrated by opposition MPs.

Investigation
Lesotho police opened an investigation into two of its employees over treason and murder for being allegedly complicit in working with the military. Deputy Police Commissioner Masupha Masupha said that "even I've been implicated. But investigating and charging are different things. If I find something, I won't shy away from confronting anyone with their unlawful acts." Lehloka Maphatsoe – an assistant police commissioner who leads the Interpol national central bureau – said that the two police officers under investigation were having their cellphones sent to South Africa where Bloemfontein police were checking for "suspicious communications" and if there were attempts to delete the evidence. Masupha hosted a meeting of all officers to hear grievances. Some said they do not trust management and made accusations of complicity because "some of you have been involved in this mess." He look to assure the officers and they could approach him anonymously with information.

Reactions
Domestic

Minister Thesele Maseribane, a possible target in the putsch, said he was not surprised by the accusation and that he suspected Kamoli and Metsing to have attempted the coup in order to halt corruption investigations against them. Police officers present on 30 August reported that soldiers demanded to see police files on the two of them. Maseribane added that "If you plan a coup, it must succeed. Because once it fails, people start talking. Many are now nervous, as others put the puzzle together and point fingers."

International

South Africa's International Relations Department's spokesperson Clayson Monyela said: "The department will either convene a media briefing or issue a statement later today regarding the situation in Lesotho." He also added that though no one claimed, the action had the markings of a putsch. Following the return of Thabane, the Methodist Church of Southern Africa welcomed the calmness in the country with Bishop Zipho Siwa saying prayers were offered for a "blood-less" resolution. "May the parties unite through peaceful dialogue and work towards a solution that will re-establish harmony, the rule of law and good governance in the country." He called for the people of Lesotho to support Thabane other officials' quest for a solution. He further lauded South African President Jacob Zuma for co-ordinating the dialogue that resulted in dispatching a SADC observer team to Lesotho.

References

Lesotho political crisis, 2014
Political crisis
Lesotho political crisis